Lucien Herr (17 January 1864 – 18 May 1926) was a French intellectual, librarian at the École Normale Supérieure in Paris, and mentor to a number of well-known socialist politicians and writers, including Jean Jaurès and Charles Péguy.  He was a leading strategist in the Dreyfusard cause (seeking to overturn the wrongful conviction for treason of Captain Alfred Dreyfus).

Influence
Herr was born at Altkirch, Haut-Rhin.  Léon Blum, the first socialist prime minister of France described Herr's intellectual impact thus:  "Herr’s strength, his truly incredible and unique strength – for I have never noted it in any other to the same degree – was essentially this: in him, conviction became evidence. For him the truth was conceived with a power so complete, so tranquil that it was communicated without effort and with ease to his interlocutor. The possibility of discussion seemed to be set aside. From his entire being there emanated this assurance: 'Yes, I think this, I think that. It is absolutely impossible for an individual of a certain quality to not think or believe it.' And you would realize that you did think or believe like him." (Léon Blum, Souvenirs sur l’Affaire. Paris, Gallimard, 1981; first published 1935).

References
Daniel Halévy, Péguy and Les Cahiers De La Quinzaine (London: Longmans, Green & Co., 1947)
Bernard Henri Lévy, Richard Veasey, Adventures on the Freedom Road Harvill Press (an imprint of Random House) , 1995, hardcover,

Further reading
 

1864 births
1926 deaths
People from Altkirch
Politicians from Grand Est
Revolutionary Socialist Workers' Party (France) politicians
French Socialist Party (1902) politicians
French Section of the Workers' International politicians
Dreyfusards